Aksu is a village in the Silopi district of Şırnak Province in Turkey. The village is populated by Assyrians and had a population of 32 in 2021, a decrease from 1,066 in 1985.

The locals are Chaldean Catholics.

History 
The village was emptied in 1991 due to the Kurdish–Turkish conflict and the locals immigrated to France. Only the local church, school and some houses remained intact. Few locals have since then returned to rebuild the village, but the village was hit by fire in 2015 which obstructed its reconstruction.

See also 

 Gazarta (Chaldean diocese)

References 

Villages in Silopi District
Assyrian communities in Turkey